La Caldera is a department located in Salta Province, Argentina.

Towns and municipalities
 La Caldera
 Vaqueros
 La Calderilla
 Los Yacones
 Potrero de Castilla

References

External links 

 Departments Salta Province website

Departments of Salta Province